Neuroligin-1 is a protein that in humans is encoded by the NLGN1 gene.

This gene encodes a member of the neuroligin family of neuronal cell surface proteins. Neuroligin-1 acts as splice site-specific ligand for β-neurexins and has been shown to localize to the postsynaptic compartment at excitatory synapses and is involved in the formation and remodeling of central nervous system synapses.

Interactions
NLGN1 has been shown to interact with NRXN1 and DLG4.

See also
Neurexins: NRXN1, NRXN2, NRXN3

References

Further reading